Daniel Barry Childs (born 16 November 1988) is a South African cricketer. A right-handed batsman and fast-medium pace bowler, he has played for the Boland province team since the 2007/08 season.

References
Daniel Childs profile at CricketArchive

1988 births
Living people
Cricketers from Cape Town
South African cricketers
Boland cricketers